Aliens versus Predator versus The Terminator is a comic published by Dark Horse Comics about fictional characters from three separate movie series: Alien, Predator, and The Terminator.  The series was in four parts, with parts 2–4 having a tagline on their cover.

Plot

Part 1
The story begins in a sewer-residing community at an undisclosed location (possibly on Earth). The characters are looking for someone when they find a seemingly decrepit woman in rags. At her request they attempt to help her stand, and she attacks them, beating the larger men easily before Annalee Call (Winona Ryder's character from Alien Resurrection) identifies herself to the woman, who is revealed to be Ripley #8, the clone of Ellen Ripley (also from Alien Resurrection). Call then takes Ripley back to her base of operations, where she expresses her sadness that Ripley left her after their promise to stay together after Alien Resurrection. She informs Ripley of a new military operation on the science station Typhoon, involving a hybrid Alien super soldier, led by a Dr. Trollenberg. Also at this point, Ripley explains that she nearly didn't sign on for her position on the Nostromo (the start of the Alien story).

The story moves to Dr. Trollenberg working on the super soldier. He is approached by General Helm, who is in charge of the station and intent on shutting down the project after Trollenberg requested cybernetic components. The doctor opens fire and kills the general and his two guards, before changing his voice to match the general's and hailing the bridge, informing them that the general will remain with him in the lab until the completion of the project and can only be contacted there. He finishes by throwing the three bodies into a vat of acid.

Back at Call's base, Ripley is still yet to be convinced to join the mission to stop Trollenberg's project. Ripley mentions that she no longer has nightmares about the aliens; she plainly states that they "can't be stopped. The aliens are coming and the human race is going to suffer...they just do what they have to do. And then you're dead and it's over."  Eventually Call blackmails Ripley, saying she will inform the military of her location, to which Ripley replies, "I could learn to hate you."

Meanwhile, a Predator is traveling toward the Typhoon, intent on hunting the super soldier. Call, her crew and Ripley infiltrate the station disguised as "the World's Most Unexceptional Food Delivery Service," and after killing the guards, move into Trollenberg's lab. Inside, they find Trollenberg, who proceeds to kill two of Call's crew (Echo and Saud) before the cloaked Predator decapitates him with its disc, leaving Call, Ripley, and the survivors stunned. Immediately, the now-decloaked Predator is thrown back into the room, only to be followed by the hulking form of the prototype super soldier who proceeds to fight the Predator.

Part 2: Monster vs. Machine
Ripley, Call and her surviving crew (Blades and Voorman) stand stunned as the prototype supersoldier and Predator fight, noting that the super soldier is almost impervious to harm and is able to absorb metal objects to regenerate damage. After tearing off one of the Predator's arms, the super soldier moves to absorb a portion of the exterior bulkhead of the lab, opening a hole into the vacuum which quickly dispatches the Predator.

Moving quickly back towards their shuttle (Carthage), with Trollenberg's head, the heroes quickly escape before the space station explodes from the breach, while the super soldier boards a smaller science vessel/escape pod, taking with it some alien chestbursters. As the space station explodes, Ripley has a bad feeling that the super soldier survived and, in the 'science pod', the super soldier commences work on a second super soldier who was also near completion.

Call suggests she hack into Trollenberg's skull to learn more about him, explaining that the skull and its wiring "is very weird... advanced in some ways, in others a real antique". Once inside Trollenberg's memory, she encounters a shell program and is approached by an interactive recording of John Connor, who goes on to explain the Skynet war, concluding with the "Skynet Resurrection Program" which used a model known as the Crypto Terminators (of which Trollenberg was one) which were capable of existing in civilization indefinitely until such time that technological advancements would allow for a new generation of Terminators which would be unstoppable (during this, scenes from Trollenberg's existence are shown, including the creation of the super soldier). The recording finishes with "the victorious forces of the 21st Century salute you... and wish you good luck".

Logging out of Trollenberg's memories, Call expresses concern that this is simply another great cover-up in history, but the discussion is cut short by three Predator spacecraft surrounding their ship. A trio of Predators teleports on board; Voorman attacks one of the Predators but is easily knocked away, while another grabs Ripley and lightly cuts her arm with its wrist blades, watching as her acidic blood burns the floor. The three Predators teleport off the ship with Ripley and their craft disappears. Elsewhere, the science pod reaches its destination (revealed in Part 3 as the Navy heavy cruiser Euphrates) and the prototype disembarks, now accompanied by a new super soldier.

Part 3: Ripley... And Company
On the Carthage, Voorman is being treated by Blades for the head injury he received from the Predator attack. Call surmises the Predators knew of Ripley's genetic heritage just as they did and that they most likely want her to assist in the threat posed by the super soldiers; she even wonders if they too encountered John Connor's sleeper virus, and ultimately decides they must use all this new information to their advantage.

Meanwhile, on one of the Predators' spacecraft, Ripley stands on a teleportation pad watching the Predators remove their helmets, who then leave her to go about their business. Ripley comments "Just when I think my life can't get any stranger... Just when I think I've fallen as far as I can fall... The bottom drops out and I wind up amazed and horrified all over again." She considers herself to now be beyond terror or outrage, even towards the Predators or their current disinterest in her. She walks through the craft, observing the work of the Predator armourers, and notes that the Predators are exuding an aura of menace throughout the 'heavy, nitrogen-rich air' of their craft, directed not at her, whom she considers they currently deem worthless, but at something else, something connected to her DNA.

Ripley finds herself in a trophy room filled with dozens of Alien corpses and body parts, and understands that the Predators' lives revolve around the Aliens and that they know that both the super soldier and she are part Alien, which leads her to wonder if they are merely adding her to their trophy collection. A Predator moves up behind her, reaching for her, causing her to recoil in anger, punching the Predator to little effect before he throws her over his shoulder and carries her away. She is taken to a circular operating table and tied down whilst a breathing apparatus is attached to her face, followed by a thin needle drill moving towards her. She resists throughout, comparing them to the military who created her, commenting "I guess I haven't fallen past terror after all...".

On the Euphrates, the ship's commanding officer complains about the 'android survivors' of the Typhoon and the super soldiers' request to be transferred to a high security asteroid facility. The CO has been uneasy since they arrived and has them restricted to the science pod. He approaches the pod and explains the delay, much to the original super soldier's displeasure, who demands access to the bridge, which the CO denies them. Shortly after a message arrives from Command, refusing the super soldiers access to the 'Black Asteroid'; this results in both super soldiers re-entering the science pod, launching and ramming the pod further into the Euphrates. The super soldiers then disembark with firearms, quickly killing the crew present before the prototype super soldier begins to absorb parts of the cruiser's interior, resulting in critical damage to the ship's primary systems, including life support.

On the Carthage, Call has determined that the Predators would be following the most likely course of the super soldier towards the nearest large source of Aliens' genetic material: Los Alamos 235, the large hill also known as mons veneris or the 'Black Asteroid'. Back on the Predators' spacecraft, Ripley experiences a dream where she is swimming in Aliens and encounters a ghostly image of a traditional Terminator endoskeleton before awaking. Regaining consciousness, Ripley notices a scar on the left rear side of her neck and is led from the operating table, past an assembled room of Predators in a Cleft of Venus formation, to a viewing screen of Los Alamos 235, sensing that there are Aliens within and that the Predators extracted this information from her DNA, from the Alien 'genetic memory'.

Nearby, the Euphrates is granted access to the Black Asteroid and opens fire on the station's control room. In the Predators' craft, Ripley has returned to the room of assembled Predators and undergoes a pre-battle ritual where she is given an Alien tooth necklace and is covered in Predator blood warpaint. Throughout the process, Ripley considers that there are monsters in this world, but the Predators are not them - they simply do what they must to survive and maintain balance in the universe when it comes to the Aliens, and that they see the arrival of the Terminator hybrids as an imbalance to the ecology of the stars, and that is the true evil. She understands that at any other time she would instead be merely a "scalp on their belts", but the current situation has made them allies and she knows "they didn't much care for my human side... But, oh, do they respect and approve of the Alien in me!"

Ripley knows she will soon "do battle with the great abomination from Earth's wretched past", as the super soldiers take control of the ship and make their way to a room filled with fully-grown Aliens in containment tubes. Ripley looks forward to destroying the man-made "agents of true human evil", and in regards to the Aliens on board, she will "ride the whirlwind to glorious annihilation. Until then, I am learning to love the Alien".

Part 4: Future Hell
The next day, hidden amongst the smaller asteroids around Los Alamos 235, the Carthage and her crew watch the space surrounding the Black Asteroid, where an entire fleet of military ships have arrived to retake the station only to be wiped out by a powerful energy surge launched from the asteroid's entry point, draining the station of all external power and lowering its defences. The Carthage moves towards the station, entering unnoticed through the entry point as Call wonders whether the Predators have already made it here and if Ripley is still alive.

Inside, Ripley lies alongside a Predator on the ground in a field of orange smoke as a monstrous super soldier crouches over them, bearing the appearance of a dark blue, muscular, bald humanoid with red eyes, fangs, clawed hands and biomechanical 'veins' at its neck and wrists. Ripley considers that the day hadn't turned out like she'd hoped as she underwent the ritual the day before, remembering how they entered the asteroid, slipping unnoticed past its defenses and the fleet outside.

They had observed that, in less than 24 hours, the two super soldiers had created an entire sophisticated manufacturing plant which quickly grew more of the new blue skinned hybrids, and Ripley and the Predators attacked without hesitation. Quickly, as on the Typhoon, the Predators were killed at every turn and even when a dying Predator activated its self-destruct device a super soldier sacrificed itself, wrapping its larger body around the Predator to absorb almost the entirety of the blast.

Ripley crawled away from the scene of the battle, finding herself amongst a stockpile of fully-grown Aliens, and saw a chance to even the odds and do what she was born to do, deactivating the stasis effect of the tubes, "to release the Hounds of Hell!" The Aliens quickly set upon the super soldiers and the Aliens' true power was revealed when a Predator killed one with his shoulder cannon, showering nearby super soldiers with acidic blood, critically wounding the hybrids. The remaining Predators used this to their advantage, unleashing blasts which spilt fatal bursts of acidic blood, killing both super soldiers and Aliens together with each shot although, ultimately, they were themselves overwhelmed by the Aliens once the last of the new super soldiers had died.

Ripley watches the carnage, frozen in place as the remaining Predators and super soldiers die, but the appearance of the prototype super soldier refocuses her and she follows through the station after him, knowing that if he escapes all their sacrifices will be for nothing. Rounding a corner, Ripley strikes out at the shadows of Call and Voorman, believing them to be the prototype, to the shock of all three of them. Ripley doesn't care for how they got there and insists that they go back the way they came and leave the station, telling them they will not survive if they go on any further and that there is nothing they can do. In the end, Ripley thanks Call: "You did the right thing, bringing me back out into the black, I know that now. Please -- go. Let me do what I can do... Let me finish the job".

Voorman agrees with Ripley and drags Call back to the Carthage, commenting that Call is "a lot closer to human than she is" as they leave. As Ripley returns to follow the original super soldier, the station begins to shake as the internal structure starts to collapse. Reaching the Carthage, Call frees herself of Voorman's grip and starts to run back into the station after Ripley, but Voorman quickly captures her and takes her aboard the Carthage, tying her to one of the seats to stop her from going after Ripley again. Throughout the process, Call resists Voorman's actions, commenting that she brought Ripley out here and forced all of this on her. Meanwhile, Ripley slips on board the ship and the hybrid prototype also boards.

The Carthage quickly exits the station, followed by the super soldier's ship, just as the station explodes. Ripley stalks towards the prototype, moving through the ship's internal piping. Ripley considers the similarities to what happened a time long ago on the Nostromo'''s escape pod, the Narcissus, where she was at the controls and the enemy stalked her instead. She realises that even now, with the roles reversed, she is just as terrified as she was then as she leaps forward to kill the prototype with a Predator knife, only to be knocked aside due to its superior speed and reflex response. Deciding to go with 'Plan B', Ripley cuts her left arm with the blade, waving it to spread her acidic blood as the super soldier holds her above him, his hands around her neck and right shoulder respectively. Ripley's blood begins to burn through the viewing panel of the airlock door, causing flames from the explosion that surrounded the ship to flood in, resulting in its destruction.

On board the Carthage, Call has been released from the seat and is at one of the monitors when Blades comments on an explosion that occurred, separate from the one of the station. Call comments that it was Ripley finishing the job: "She cleaned up the mess that we stumbled into. What the Connor virus told me -- about Skynet returning? She closed the book on that. I know she did. I forced her back out there. I got her into this. I'm going to have to live with that. I hope she made her peace. I think she got her dignity back. And her soul, maybe. Yeah. And her soul. And maybe she saved mankind's soul in the bargain. Let's go home."

Collected editions
The work has been collected as a trade paperback:

 Aliens versus Predator versus The Terminator (Dark Horse Comics, 96 pages, 2001)

See also
Other related comic series include:AliensAlien vs. PredatorPredatorThe Terminator''

References

External links
Official Dark Horse website

Alien vs. Predator (franchise) comics
Comics based on films
Crossover comics
Intercompany crossovers
Terminator (franchise) comics